WWF Raw is a professional wrestling video game released on the Xbox and Microsoft Windows by THQ in 2002. It is based on the television series of the same name. It was the first WWF game released on the Xbox and also the last WWF game released on PC until the release of WWE 2K15 12 years later in 2014. It is also the last game released under the WWF name as the World Wrestling Federation changed its name to World Wrestling Entertainment (WWE) in May of that year.

Gameplay 
The game offers the players a wrestling experience with various matches like singles match, tag team match, triple threat, fatal four-way, battle royal and handicap matches. The players can also play various tournaments such as King of the Ring and several title tournaments. They can create their own character as well as their attire, move set and entrance. The game has a weak/strong grapple system and there are two types of grapples: one which is done with normal opponents and other with groggy opponents. The normal grapples do little harm when compared to grapples done when the opponent is stunned. There is a voltage meter which shows the momentum of the wrestlers. Special move, high flying attacks and taunting boost momentum while repeated attacks cost loss in momentum. Finishers can only be applied when the opponent is stunned and the voltage meter is flashing. Excessive use of finisher also cause loss in momentum.

Development
During development, the game was originally called WWF Raw is War, but the title was changed after the WWF shortened the television show's title in October 2001 due to the end of Monday Night Wars. In Japan, a limited edition was released with a shirt and a figure of the Undertaker or "Hollywood" Hulk Hogan (who does not appear in the game).

Reception 

The game received "mixed or average reviews" on both platforms according to video game review aggregator Metacritic. In Japan, Famitsu gave the Xbox version an unfavorably low score of 10 out of 40.

Sequel

A sequel to the game, titled WWE Raw 2, was released in 2003 on the Xbox.

See also 

 List of licensed wrestling video games
 List of fighting games

References

External links 
 

WWE Raw video games
WWE video games
Xbox games
Windows games
2002 video games
THQ games
Video games developed in Japan
Video games scored by Takayuki Nakamura
Professional wrestling games